Saint Peter's-By-The-Sea Episcopal Church, known locally as The Gingerbread Church, is a historic church located at the junction of Ocean Avenue and Lake Drive in Cape May Point, Cape May County, New Jersey, United States. It was documented by the Historic American Buildings Survey in 1992. It was later added to the National Register of Historic Places on August 3, 1995 for its significance in Stick/Eastlake architecture and also community planning and development.

History
The church is a one-story frame building with a high central clerestory and features Stick/Eastlake architecture with the stick components painted white in contrast to the siding in blue. Originally built for Philadelphia's 1876 Centennial Exhibition, the church was moved to Cape May Point in 1879. It has been moved four times since, first to get a cooler location closer to the shore, then, as the shoreline retreated, to safer locations away from the shore. It is now near the original site, and much closer to the shore.

See also
National Register of Historic Places listings in Cape May County, New Jersey
List of Episcopal churches in the United States

References

External links
 
 
 

Cape May Point, New Jersey
Episcopal church buildings in New Jersey
Churches on the National Register of Historic Places in New Jersey
Stick style architecture in New Jersey
Churches completed in 1876
19th-century Episcopal church buildings
Churches in Cape May County, New Jersey
National Register of Historic Places in Cape May County, New Jersey
New Jersey Register of Historic Places
Historic American Buildings Survey in New Jersey